Maurice Roberts (26 August 1916 – 24 April 1998) was an Australian cricketer. He played in three first-class matches for South Australia between 1937 and 1947.

See also
 List of South Australian representative cricketers

References

External links
 

1916 births
1998 deaths
Australian cricketers
South Australia cricketers
Cricketers from Adelaide